Ciliopagurus galzini is a species of hermit crab. It is one of four species in the "strigatus complex"; it resembles C. strigatus, with the most prominent difference being coloration. It is common in the shallow intertidal waters of the Tuamotus.

References

Hermit crabs
Crustaceans described in 2009